Farhad Mosaffa (Persian: فرهاد مصفی, born: September 22, 1989) is an Iranian model he is the first Iranian Contestant crowned as Mr Iran, he competed in Manhunt International 2012, the world's first and oldest male modeling competition.

Early life
Born in Iran, he moved to Vancouver, British Columbia, Canada as an infant. Farhad attended McGill University and the University of British Columbia pursuing a career in medicine. He was scouted by Orange Models at seventeen years old. At the age of eighteen Mosaffa progressed into working with a number of fashion companies, most notably Folio, he made his debut as a runway model at the L’Oreal Fashion Week for Zoran Dubric and the Parasucco Collections held in Toronto, Ontario, Canada in 2009. His career went off from there leading him to sign campaign deals for Names like H&M, Cassey Rodford and Lipton.

Career 
Etro  (Catalog)
Iceberg (Catalog)
Cassey Rodford (Spread) 
Creative Outlook (Spread)
Erica (Campaign) 
Martha Stewart Living (Print) 
Harry Rosen (Spread) 
Maxim (Catalog) 
L’Oreal Fashion Week (Runway)
Zoran Dubric (Runway)
Angels and Demons (Runway)
Dubai Fashion Week (Runway)
Rajesh Pratap Singh (Runway)
Manish Malhotra (Runway)
Cynthia (Catalog)
H&M (Campaign) 
Lipton (MBC4 TV Commercial)

References 

 Exclusive Interview With Farhad Mosaffa, Manhunt International Iran 2012 .  The Stunning Angels. 2010. Retrieved 05, May 2013.
 Farhad Mosaffa Male Model on Man Central. 01, December 2012.
 beautycontests.blogspot.com/...iran-2012-farhad-mosaffa.html. 10, November 2012.
 http://m.beautypageantnews.com/farhad-mosaffa-manhunt-international-iran-2012/. 02, November 2012
 Loving Male Models - Farhad Mosaffa. 17, November 2012
 Online Portfolio. Retrieved 05, May 2013.

External links 
 Manhunt international Official Website

Canadian male models
Iranian emigrants to Canada
Living people
Manhunt International winners
Canadian beauty pageant contestants
1990 births